The Social Liberal Party is a political party in São Tomé and Príncipe. The party failed to win any seats in the National Assembly following elections held on 26 March 2006.

The party supported Fradique de Menezes in the 30 July 2006 presidential election. He was re-elected with 60.58% of the vote.

Political parties in São Tomé and Príncipe
Social liberal parties